The 1976 CONMEBOL Pre-Olympic Tournament was the 5th CONMEBOL Pre-Olympic Tournament.

Bolivia, Ecuador, Paraguay and Venezuela did not participate.

Brazil and Uruguay qualified for the 1976 Summer Olympics.

Group stage

References 

CONMEBOL Pre-Olympic Tournament
1976 in association football
1976 in South American football